Eileen Tompkins (born December 17, 1933) is an American politician who served in the Minnesota House of Representatives from 1985 to 1999.

References

1933 births
Living people
Women state legislators in Minnesota
Republican Party members of the Minnesota House of Representatives
Place of birth missing (living people)
21st-century American women